The 1996 United States presidential election in Oregon took place on November 5, 1996, as part of the 1996 United States presidential election. Voters chose seven representatives, or electors to the Electoral College, who voted for president and vice president.

Oregon was won by President Bill Clinton (D) over Senator Bob Dole (R-Kansas), with Clinton winning 47.2% to 39.1% for a margin of 8.1%. Billionaire businessman Ross Perot (Reform-Texas) finished in third, with 8.8% of the popular vote.

Oregon was one of thirteen states where, on the election ballot, James Campbell of California, Perot’s former boss at IBM, was listed as a stand-in candidate for vice president.

, this is the last occasion when the Democratic Party candidate has carried Gilliam, Morrow and Coos Counties. It is also the only occasion since 1968 when Gilliam County has voted for a Democrat, the last time any Eastern Oregon county sided with a Democrat, and the last time a victorious Democratic candidate would only win the state with a single digit margin of victory.

Results

Results by county

See also
 United States presidential elections in Oregon
 Presidency of Bill Clinton

References

Oregon
1996
President